Ray Hammond is a British author and futurist.

Selected bibliography

Fiction
The Cloud (2006)
Emergence (2002)
Extinction (2005)

Non-fiction
Forward 100 (1984)
Digital Business: Surviving and Thriving In An On-Line World (1996)
The Modern Frankenstein - Fiction Becomes Fact (1986)
The Musician and the Micro (1983)

References

External links
Ray Hammond home page

20th-century births
Year of birth missing (living people)
Living people
Futurologists
Systems thinking